The 2017 San Benedetto Tennis Cup was a professional tennis tournaments played on clay courts. It was the 13th edition of the tournament which was part of the 2017 ATP Challenger Tour. The event takes place in San Benedetto del Tronto, Italy, from 17 to 23 July 2017.

Singles entrants

Seeds 

 1 Rankings as of 3 July 2017.

Other entrants 
The following players received wildcards into the singles main draw:
  Gianluca Mager
  Andrea Pellegrino
  Alexei Popyrin
  Luca Vanni

The following players received entry into the singles main draw using protected rankings:
  Flavio Cipolla
  Roberto Marcora
  Javier Martí

The following player received entry into the singles main draw as a special exempt:
  Laslo Đere

The following players received entry from the qualifying draw:
  Mate Delić
  Gonzalo Escobar
  Juan Pablo Paz
  Adelchi Virgili

Champions

Singles 

  Matteo Berrettini def.  Laslo Đere 6–3, 6–4.

Doubles 

  Carlos Taberner /  Pol Toledo Bagué def.  Flavio Cipolla /  Adrian Ungur 7–5, 6–4.

References

2017 ATP Challenger Tour
2017
2017 in Italian tennis